Love and Rockets is the fourth studio album by English alternative rock band Love and Rockets; released in 1989 by Beggars Banquet Records on cassette, vinyl, and compact disc.

Background 

Love and Rockets dismissed Earth, Sun, Moon's folk sound in favour of a stronger rock sound. Hints of the band's former psychedelic and gothic rock sound remain. Chief songwriters Daniel Ash and David J had begun concentrating strictly on their own material (rather than writing together) on Earth, Sun, Moon.

The album featured Love and Rockets' biggest hit, the Ash-penned "So Alive". The song was a surprising number 3 hit on the Billboard Hot 100, and stayed at number 1 for five weeks on the US Modern Rock chart. Because of the popularity of the single in the US, Love and Rockets became the band's best-selling album in America. It did very well in Canada as well, being certified platinum there in 1989, largely on the strength of "So Alive" which was a #1 single.

After the release of the album, the band embarked on a long worldwide tour. Afterward, instead of recording a new album and a follow-up single to "So Alive", J and Ash both focused on their solo careers, continuing in the directions represented on this album. They each released two solo albums after the break (with drummer Kevin Haskins working primarily with Ash) before returning as a band to record Hot Trip to Heaven in 1994.

In 2002, the album was remastered and expanded into a double album. The bonus tracks featured a single remix, three b-sides, all five songs from the aborted Swing! EP, and a radio session. The Swing! project was to be an outlet for some of the band's eccentric output, but the material was never released, except for "Bad Monkey", which ended up on the Glittering Darkness EP in 1996.

"The Purest Blue" is a radical reworking of "Waiting for the Flood" from Earth, Sun, Moon, and "**** (Jungle Law)" was later reworked as "Bad Monkey", recorded as part of the Swing! project.

Track listing

Personnel

Love and Rockets
David J – vocals, bass guitar, harmonica, guitars, bass feedback, keyboards
Daniel Ash – vocals, guitars, saxophone, bass guitar, fuzz bass, keyboards
Kevin Haskins – drums, keyboards, samples, vibraphone, guitar feedback, percussion

Additional personnel
"Mr. Drum Machine" – drum programming on "The Purest Blue"
John Fryer – string synthesizer on "The Teardrop Collector"
Lorna Wright, Sylvia Mason-James, Ruby James – backing vocals on "So Alive"
Bill Thorp – string arrangement on "Rock & Roll Babylon" (Bill Thorp & Brian Brooks: violin; Josie Abbott: cello; Penny Thompson: viola)

Production
Produced by John Fryer & Love and Rockets
Recorded & Mixed by John Fryer at Blackwing Studios (London) except "The Purest Blue"; recorded & mixed by "Whispering Angus" at Far Heath Studios (Northamptonshire)

References 

1989 albums
Love and Rockets (band) albums
Albums produced by John Fryer (producer)
Beggars Banquet Records albums
RCA Records albums